The GyroTec DF02 is a German autogyro, designed and produced by GyroTec Michael Obermaier of Wörth am Rhein.  The DF02 is supplied as complete ready-to-fly-aircraft.

Design and development
The DF02 features a single main rotor, a single-seat enclosed cockpit with an optional bubble canopy, tricycle landing gear and a twin cylinder, liquid-cooled, two-stroke, dual-ignition, fuel-injected  Hirth 3503 engine in pusher configuration.

The rotor head was designed by GyroTec and includes a disc-style rotor brake, pre-rotator and integral articulation stops.

The bubble canopy can be removed for flight in warm weather. In 2009 the canopy size was increased to accommodate taller pilots.

Specifications (DF02)

References

External links

2000s German sport aircraft
Single-engined pusher autogyros